Karl Piirisild (2 April 1890 Orava Parish, Võru County – ?) was an Estonian politician. He was a member of I Riigikogu. He was a member of the Riigikogu since 4 December 1922. He replaced Johannes Semm.

References

1890 births
Members of the Riigikogu, 1920–1923
Year of death missing